The 2015 AVP Pro Beach Volleyball Tour was a domestic professional beach volleyball circuit organized in the United States by the Association of Volleyball Professionals (AVP) for the 2015 beach volleyball season.

Schedule

This is the complete schedule of events on the 2015 calendar, with team progression documented from the semifinals stage. All tournaments consisted of single-elimination qualifying rounds followed by a double-elimination main draw.

Men

Women

Milestones and events
Seattle Open
Misty May-Treanor competed with Brittany Hochevar, marking May-Treanor's first return to competition since her retirement after winning gold at the 2012 Summer Olympics with Kerri Walsh Jennings.

Miscellaneous
AVP and NBC Sports Group signed an agreement for NBC Sports to air 17.5 hours of AVP tournaments, 10 hours on NBC and 7.5 hours on NBCSN, as well as livestreaming on NBC Sports Live Extra.
April Ross became the first player to win four AVP tournaments with three different partners, after her regular partner Kerri Walsh Jennings suffered a shoulder injury that kept her from playing for most of the season.

Statistics leaders

Men's statistical leaders

Women's statistical leaders

Points distribution

Awards
The 2015 AVP Awards Banquet was held on October 28 in Newport Beach, California. The season's top performers were chosen based on statistics, player votes and AVP national ranking points earned during the year.

References

Association of Volleyball Professionals
AVP Pro Beach Volleyball Tour